Toheeb Jimoh is an English actor. He is best known for his appearances as Sam Obisanya in Ted Lasso and Anthony Walker in the BBC One TV movie Anthony.

Early life 
Jimoh was born on 15 April 1997 in London, England, to parents of Nigerian descent. Though he was mostly raised in the UK, he spent time living in Nigeria when he was growing up. He attended The Norwood School and then trained at the Guildhall School of Music and Drama, graduating in 2018.

Career
Jimoh was a relative newcomer to acting when he was cast to play Anthony Walker, the victim of a 2005 racist attack, in BBC One's Anthony, which imagines Walker's life if he had not been killed. His portrayal was called "utterly magnetic". He then portrayed Marcus in the Amazon series The Feed.

Jimoh was in a stage production of A Midsummer Night's Dream at the Sheffield Crucible and in 2020, was one of six performers in the Almeida Theatre's Christmas Play Nine Lessons and Carols, the theatre's first production post London's COVID-19 lockdown.

When Jimoh auditioned for Ted Lasso, the character of Sam Obisanya was written as Ghanaian, but his background was changed to Nigerian to match Jimoh's own. His performance has received praise, with his character called the "heartbeat" of the show.

Jimoh portrays another Nigerian character, journalist Tunde, in the upcoming Amazon thriller series The Power, based on Naomi Alderman's novel of the same name. He also has a small part in the Wes Anderson film The French Dispatch.

Filmography

Film

Television

Awards and nominations
Jimoh was nominated for an I Talk Telly Best Breakthrough Award in 2020. He was nominated alongside his Ted Lasso castmates for Outstanding Performance by an Ensemble Cast in a Comedy Series at the 2021 Screen Actors Guild Awards, and for Outstanding Supporting Actor in a Comedy Series at the 74th Primetime Emmy Awards in 2022 (alongside castmates Brett Goldstein and Nick Mohammed).

In December 2021, Jimoh received the Breakthrough Award at the Critics Choice Awards Celebration of Black Cinema and Television.

References

External links
 

Living people
1997 births
Alumni of the Guildhall School of Music and Drama
English people of Nigerian descent
Black British male actors
British male film actors
British male television actors
Male actors from London